Growing Pains is an American television sitcom created by Neal Marlens that aired on ABC from September 24, 1985, to April 25, 1992. The show ran for seven seasons, consisting of 166 episodes. The series followed the misadventures of the Seaver family, which included psychiatrist and father Jason, journalist and mother Maggie, and their children Mike, Carol, Ben, and Chrissy.

Premise

The show centers on the Seaver family of Huntington, Long Island, New York. Dr. Jason Seaver (portrayed by Alan Thicke), a psychiatrist, works from home because his wife, Maggie (Joanna Kerns), has gone back to work as a reporter. Jason has to take care of the kids: ladies' man and rebellious troublemaker Mike (Kirk Cameron), bookish honors student Carol (Tracey Gold), and rambunctious Ben (Jeremy Miller) who follows Mike as his role model and becomes a troublemaker too.

A fourth child, Chrissy Seaver (twins Kelsey and Kirsten Dohring; Ashley Johnson), is born at the beginning of season 4, a day after Ben's 12th birthday.  She was played in her newborn/infant stage by two uncredited sets of twin sisters, who remained in the role until season four (1988–89) ended. By season five (1989–90), she was played in her toddler stage by alternating twins Kirsten and Kelsey Dohring. In seasons six and seven (1990–92), Chrissy's age was advanced to five years old.

A new cast member was added for the seventh and final season (1991–92) when homeless teen Luke Brower (Leonardo DiCaprio) is brought into the Seaver family to live with them until nearly the end of season seven.

Often mentioned but rarely seen are the Seavers' next-door neighbors, the Koosmans – a reference to the 1969 Miracle Mets, as Tom Seaver and Jerry Koosman anchored the 1969 Mets' pitching rotation.

Cast and characters

Main 
 Alan Thicke as Dr. Jason Roland Seaver
 Joanna Kerns as Margaret Katherine "Maggie" (née Malone) Seaver
 Kirk Cameron as Michael Aaron "Mike" Seaver
 Tracey Gold as Caroline Anne "Carol" Seaver
 Jeremy Miller as Benjamin Hubert Horatio Humphrey "Ben"  Seaver
 Ashley Johnson as Christine Ellen "Chrissy" Seaver (seasons 6–7)
 Kelsey and Kirsten Dohring as Christine Ellen "Chrissy" Seaver (toddler) (season 5, alternating)
 Leonardo DiCaprio as Luke Brower (season 7)

Recurring 
 Andrew Koenig as Richard Milhous "Boner" Stabone (seasons 1–4, 25 episodes), Mike's friend; left to join the United States Marine Corps
 Chelsea Noble as Kate MacDonald (seasons 5–7, 22 episodes), Mike's girlfriend
 Jamie Abbott as Stinky Sullivan (seasons 2–6, 19 episodes), Ben's friend
 K. C. Martel as Eddie Ziff (seasons 1–7, 19 episodes), Mike's friend
 Sam Anderson as Principal Willis DeWitt (seasons 1–7, 13 episodes), Mike's history teacher in season one and principal from season two onward
 Betty McGuire as Kate Malone (seasons 1–7, 12 episodes); Maggie's mother
 Lisa Capps as Debbie (seasons 2–4, 12 episodes), Carol's friend
 Rachel Jacobs as Shelley (seasons 2–4, 12 episodes), Carol's friend
 Gordon Jump as Ed Malone (seasons 1–7, 11 episodes); Maggie's father
 Julie McCullough as Julie Costello (seasons 4–5, 11 episodes), Mike's former girlfriend who was originally hired by Jason to be Chrissy's nanny in the first appearance
 Bill Kirchenbauer as Coach Graham Lubbock (seasons 2–3; starred in spin-off Just the Ten of Us), a gym teacher
 Jane Powell as Irma Seaver (seasons 4–6, 8 episodes), Jason's mother
 Jodi Peterson as Laura Lynn (seasons 4–6, 6 episodes), Ben's girlfriend/love interest
 Kevin Wixted as Bobby Wynette (seasons 2–3, 6 episodes), Carol's former boyfriend
 Christopher Burgard as Dwight Halliburton (seasons 7, 6 episodes), Carol's love interest
 Evan Arnold as Richie Flanscopper (seasons 1–3, 6 episodes), Carol's school classmate who has a crush on her
 Fred Applegate as Mr. Fred Tedesco (season 7, 4 episodes), the principal of the learning annex where Mike teaches

Episodes

Production
Soon after the cancelation of The Four Seasons, Joanna Kerns auditioned for a new series in late 1984, called Growing Pains. She auditioned with Alan Thicke, who was coming off the failure of his TV talk show Thicke of the Night. Kerns joked in many interviews that she and Alan had immediate chemistry, especially when she kissed him on his nose by accident during their audition together. Kerns and Thicke's chemistry won them both the parts, and the two became great friends off the show; they both had many things in common, including both being newly divorced and both being single parents.

In 1985, Tracey Gold auditioned for Carol Seaver's role on Growing Pains but was not initially cast. The actress chosen for the pilot was Elizabeth Ward, who had starred alongside Gold in The Hand-Me-Down Kid, a 1983 ABC Afterschool Special. However, test audiences did not favor Ward in Carol's role, and Gold promptly replaced her. In 1988 at age 19, Gold gained some weight over the Growing Pains series hiatus. That season, the sitcom's scripts called for her to be the brunt of fat jokes from her television brothers for many episodes in a row.

In October 1988, Gold dieted from 133 pounds to about 110 pounds on a medically supervised  diet, but occasionally, the scripts still included fat jokes at her expense. In her memoir, she says that between 1989 and 1991, she became increasingly obsessed with food and her weight and continued to slowly and steadily lose weight.

Kirk Cameron was an atheist in his early teens. When he was 17, during the height of his career on Growing Pains, he became a born-again Christian. After converting to Protestant Christianity, he began to insist that plot lines be edited to remove anything he thought too adult or inappropriate in Growing Pains. Cameron's conversion is said to have alienated him from his fellow cast members, as he did not invite any of them to his 1991 wedding.

Julie McCullough landed the role of nanny Julie Costello on the show in 1989. Her character appeared in eight episodes until McCullough was fired in 1990. Though the show's producers have claimed that her character was never intended to be permanent and Cameron stated in his 2008 memoir Still Growing that he did not call for her firing, it is alleged McCullough's termination from the show was a result of Cameron's objections to her having posed nude in Playboy, prompting Cameron to claim to the producers they were promoting pornography by hiring McCullough. Cameron reportedly did not reconcile with McCullough, who claims that Cameron refused to speak to her during a later encounter. She remains critical of him, stating that the public criticism she endured during the controversy damaged her career.

At about age 14, Jeremy Miller received numerous letters from an older male stalker during the run of Growing Pains.

In 1990, Tracey Gold began group therapy in an eating disorder program but only learned more ways to lose weight. That season, her weight loss problem was touched upon slightly on the series, when Gold is seen looking at her body in a carnival mirror and describes to another character the distorted image in her head. In 1991, she started starving herself more than ever and vomiting, and lost a massive amount of weight, to the point that she was admitted to a hospital in early 1992. Her lowest weight is estimated to have been near 80 pounds. She was suspended from the show for her skeletal appearance. Photos of Gold's emaciated body were plastered all over tabloid magazines, and she was one of the first celebrities ever to be formally outed for anorexia. She last appeared in the 1991 episode, "Menage a Luke," after missing the two prior episodes where her problem is very obvious in some scenes and did not return until the last two episodes of the series in the late spring of 1992. Gold eventually recovered from her years-long struggle and starred in the 1994 television movie For the Love of Nancy, drawing on her own experiences with anorexia nervosa to portray the title character.

In 1991, Leonardo DiCaprio became a recurring cast member on Growing Pains, playing Luke Brower, a homeless boy who is taken in by the Seaver family. Co-star Joanna Kerns recalled DiCaprio being "especially intelligent and disarming for his age," but also mischievous on set. The teenage DiCaprio was cast by the producers to appeal to the teenage female audiences, but when the show's ratings did not improve, DiCaprio left. He was nominated for a Young Artist Award for Best Young Actor Co-starring in a Television Series.

In 1992, Alan Thicke appeared in the pilot episode of the sitcom Hangin' with Mr. Cooper. He appeared in the pre-credits teaser scene, alongside series star Mark Curry, humorously referencing the pilot episode being filmed on the same set used as the Seavers' home on Growing Pains.

After the series was canceled, Kirk Cameron did not maintain contact with his former co-stars and did not speak to Tracey Gold for eight years. Cameron has stated that this was not due to any animosity on his part toward any of his former cast-members but an outgrowth of his desire to start a new life away from the entertainment industry. In 2000, Cameron revealed he apologized to his TV family for some of his prior behavior, saying, "If I could go back, I think I could make decisions that were less inadvertently hurtful to the cast--like talking and explaining to them why I just wanted to have my family at my wedding."

Awards and nominations

Spin-off
Growing Pains spawned the spin-off series, Just the Ten of Us, which featured Coach Graham Lubbock, Mike and Carol's gym teacher, moving to California with his large family to teach at an all-boys Catholic school after he was fired from Thomas Dewey High School.

Reunion movies
In 2000, the cast reunited for The Growing Pains Movie, followed by Growing Pains: Return of the Seavers in 2004. Before the premiere of The Growing Pains Movie, Kirk Cameron described his regrets over how his relationship with his cast mates changed after his religious conversion during the production of the series, admitting, "I definitely kind of made an about-face, going toward another aspect of my life," and "I shifted my focus from 100% on the show, to 100% on [my new life], and left 0% on the show—and even the friendships that were a part of that show."

Home media
Warner Home Video has released the first two seasons on DVD in Region 1. In contrast, the Warner Archive Collection released the remaining seasons as a manufactured-on-demand title that can only be available exclusively through Warner's online store and Amazon.com.

Syndication

United States
ABC aired reruns of the show on its daytime schedule from July 1988 to August 1989. The show originally aired at 11:00 AM (ET) until January 1989, when Ryan's Hope was canceled and Home was expanded to an hour from 11:00 AM–noon. The reruns moved to noon.

In the fall of 1989, the show was sold to local syndication, which continued until 1997. The show also aired on TBS for several years premiering in October 1993 at 6:35 PM. The show continued to air on TBS until September 1996.

Reruns aired on the Disney Channel from September 1997 to September 2001. The cable rights for the show moved to sister network ABC Family, where it ran from 2001 to 2004. It has also aired on ION Television during the fall of 2006 into the spring of 2007.

Nick at Nite began airing Growing Pains on February 12, 2007, launching with a marathon from 9:00 PM–1:00 AM. It was pulled from the line-up shortly after, and reruns later moved to sister network Noggin (as part of its teen block, The N). TeenNick re-aired the series on Monday, September 13, 2010, in a 5:00 AM hour block, and aired its final showings on December 27, 2010.

Growing Pains aired on Up TV from January 2015 to July 2017. Antenna TV began airing the series in December 2017.

It is currently available on the Roku channel (streaming app) as of November 2019.

Asia
Mainland China
 The show was dubbed by Shanghai Television in the late 1980s Chéngzhǎng de Fánnǎo (成长的烦恼; literally "Growing vexation")
Taiwan
 The show was dubbed by Chinese Television System in the 1980s–1990s Huānlè Jiātíng (歡樂家庭; Happy Family)
Japan
 Growing Pains was dubbed in Japanese, and broadcast by the NHK of Japan in the title of "Yukai na Shiba Ke (愉快なシーバー家)" (Happy Seaver family) from 1997 to 2000
Indonesia
 Growing Pains was broadcast by RCTI from September 1989 to August 1991 and re-run by SCTV from 1991 to around 1994.
 Philippines
 Growing Pains was aired by PTV-4 with Simulcast on GMA-7 in 1986–1991; it moved to ABC-5 in 1993–2000 with English Dubbed in 1993–1994 & Tagalized in 1994–2000

Europe
France
The show aired with the title Quoi de neuf docteur? (What's New Doctor?) on Antenne 2 from 1987 then as part of a block called Giga from February 19, 1990, on the same network.

Two books were published in French exclusively about Growing Pains: Cyrille Rollet, Ph.D. (EHESS, Paris),
 Physiologie d'un sitcom américain (voyage au cœur de Growing Pains), (volume 1) – Physiology of an American Sitcom (Journey to the Heart of Growing Pains)
 Circulation culturelle d'un sitcom américain (volume 2) – The Cultural Circulation of an American Sitcom

Germany
The show aired with the title Unser lautes Heim (Our noisy home) on ProSieben from 1993.

Italy
The show aired in 1987 with the title Genitori in blue jeans (Parents in blue jeans) where the first two seasons original aired on Canale 5 then it moved to Italia 1 for the later four seasons. This was also the name of an Italian comedy film from the 60s.

Netherlands
The show aired in 1986 with Dutch broadcast organization AVRO as Growing Pains in English with subtitles in Dutch.

Spain

In Spain the series aired with the title Los problemas crecen (Growing problems) and was dubbed to Spanish. Originally aired in La 1 (Spanish TV channel) from the end of the 80s to the beginning of the 90s, and subsequently in La 2 (Spanish TV channel), Antena 3 (Spanish TV channel) y Factoría de Ficción

Australasia
Australia
 Digital free-to-air channel 7TWO began airing reruns of Growing Pains in October 2010, and reached the final episode in June 2011, replacing it with Night Court. The Nine Network first aired the show back in the 1980s and 1990s.

New Zealand
 The show aired on TVNZ's TV2 on Saturday afternoons in the late 1980s-early 1990s.

Turkey
The show aired at the beginning of the 1990s on Turkey's first private TV channel, Star TV.

Latin America
The show was previously aired on Nickelodeon's block, Nick at Nite from 2006 to 2009.

References

Bibliography

External links
 
 Growing Pains French website 
 Growing Pains  at UP TV Network

 
1985 American television series debuts
1992 American television series endings
1980s American sitcoms
1990s American sitcoms
American Broadcasting Company original programming
English-language television shows
Metafictional television series
Television series by Warner Bros. Television Studios
Television shows set in Long Island
Television series about families
Television series about journalism
Television shows adapted into films
Television series created by Neal Marlens
Television series about siblings
Coming-of-age television shows